Brilliant Legacy (also known as Shining Inheritance) is a 2009 South Korean television series starring Han Hyo-joo, Lee Seung-gi, Bae Soo-bin, and Moon Chae-won. It aired on SBS from April 25 to July 26, 2009 on Saturdays and Sundays at 21:45 for 28 episodes.

It was among the top-rated Korean dramas of the year; it maintained its number one spot in the viewership ratings chart for 20 consecutive weeks and reached a peak rating of 47.1% for its last episode.

Synopsis
Go Eun-sung (Han Hyo-joo) was studying overseas in New York and returned to Korea during her vacation to bring her autistic brother, Eun-woo (Yeon Joon-seok), to the United States to study music. Sunwoo Hwan (Lee Seung-gi), who was also studying in New York, was ordered to return to Korea by his grandmother, Jang Sook-ja (Ban Hyo-jung), to learn how to manage her food company. Eun-sung and Hwan, who were on the same flight back home, accidentally had their luggage bags exchanged, which led to several misunderstandings between the two.

Go Pyung-joong (Jeon In-taek), Eun-sung's father, was struggling to save his company from going bankrupt. One day, his wallet and valuables were stolen by a thief who subsequently died in a gas explosion accident. The police, upon finding Pyung-joong's belongings on the thief, mistakenly identified the thief as him and a death certificate for Pyung-joong was promptly issued. He decided to lie low and not tell his family that he was alive so that his family could claim his life insurance money and use it to clear the debts. However his second wife, Baek Sung-hee (Kim Mi-sook), kicked her stepchildren, Eun-sung and Eun-woo, out of the house after collecting the insurance money and moved into a new home with her daughter, Yoo Seung-mi (Moon Chae-won). Seung-mi was also Hwan's longtime best friend, hoping to be something more.

Eun-sung asked for help from several of her friends, including Hyung-jin, who avoided her because she was no longer rich. She managed to find a job at a nightclub with the help of her friend, Hye-ri. At the nightclub, Eun-sung met Hyung-jin's upperclassman, Park Joon-se (Bae Soo-bin), who was shocked to see her working there. She also met Hwan, who caused her to lose contact with Eun-woo. Realizing that Eun-woo was missing, Eun-sung was devastated and tried searching for her brother but to no avail. With the help of Hye-ri and Joon-se, Eun-sung rented a small room and started a small dumplings stall while continuing her search for Eun-woo.

Meanwhile, Sook-ja became deeply disappointed in her grandson as Hwan had no direction in life and did not know how to cherish her company and employees. While pondering over what to do about her grandson, Sook-ja visited a neighborhood that she used to live in when she was poor and encountered Eun-sung, who was selling dumplings. Sook-ja encountered an accident and received help from Eun-sung. Seeing that Eun-sung tried her best to take care of her even when she could not afford her own daily expenses, Sook-ja was touched by Eun-sung's compassion. She brought Eun-sung home, then announced to her family that Eun-sung was going to live with them and that she was going to appoint Eun-sung as the heir of her food company, if she could raise the profits of the sinking second branch by 20%.

Cast

Main Cast

 Han Hyo-joo as Go Eun-sung
 Lee Seung-gi as Sunwoo Hwan

Go family
 Jeon In-taek as Go Pyung-joong (father)
 Kim Mi-sook as Baek Sung-hee (stepmother)
 Moon Chae-won as Yoo Seung-mi (stepsister)
 Yeon Joon-seok as Go Eun-woo (younger brother)

Sunwoo family
 Ban Hyo-jung as Jang Sook-ja (grandmother)
 Yu Ji-in as Oh Young-ran (mother)
 Han Ye-won as Sunwoo Jung (younger sister)
 Lee Seung-hyung as Pyo Sung-chul

Park family
 Bae Soo-bin as Park Joon-se
 Choi Jung-woo as Park Tae-soo (father)

Extended cast
 Min Young-won as Lee Hye-ri (Eun-sung's friend)
 Jung Suk-won as Jin Young-seok (Hwan's friend)
 Son Yeo-eun as Jung In-young (Eun-sung and Seung-mi's friend)
 Kim Jae-seung as Lee Hyung-jin (Joon-se's junior colleague)
 Baek Seung-hyeon as Lee Joon-young / Manager Lee (store manager)
 Park Sang-hyun as Han Soo-jae (store worker)
 Kim Sung-oh as Seon Woo Hwan's friend (Ep.7)

Original soundtrack
 Only You (너 하나만) – Kang Ha-ni (Opening Title)
 The Person Living in My Heart (내 가슴에 사는 사람) – Isu
 Crazy in Love (사랑에 미쳐서) – Ji-sun
 Love is Punishment (사랑은 벌이다) – K.Will
 Spring Rain – Ji-hye
 Dear Sister (그리운 누나)
 Catch Hwan (환이를 잡아라)
 Are We Family? (우리가 가족이니?)
 Funny Life
 The Road Leading to You (너에게 가는 길)
 Smile Working
 Last Lie (마지막 거짓말)
 Bickering (티격태격)
 Memories of Separation (이별의 기억)
 Spring Rain (Guitar Ver.)
 Destiny, the Second Story (운명, 그 두번째 이야기)

Ratings
In this table,  represent the lowest ratings and  represent the highest ratings.

Source: TNS Media Korea

Awards and nominations

Remake
A Chinese remake titled My Splendid Life (我的灿烂人生 Wo De Can Lan Ren Sheng) starring Jerry Yan and Yedda Chen aired on Dragon TV in 2011.
A Turkish remake titled Never Let My Hand Go (Elımı Bırakma) starring Alp Navruz and Alina Boz aired on TRT 1.

References

External links
 

Brilliant Legacy at the Korea Tourism Organization

Seoul Broadcasting System television dramas
2009 South Korean television series debuts
2009 South Korean television series endings
Korean-language television shows
South Korean romance television series
Television series by Pan Entertainment